Andy White may refer to:

 Andy White (drummer) (1930–2015), Scottish studio drummer
 Andy White (singer-songwriter) (born 1962), Irish singer/songwriter and poet
 Andy White (footballer, born 1948), Welsh football player for Newport County
 Andy White (footballer, born 1981), English football player for Mansfield Town and Kidderminster Harriers
 Andy White (footballer, born 1991), English football player for Gillingham
 E. B. White (1899–1985), American author, nicknamed "Andy" after Andrew Dickson White
 Andrew Dickson White (1832–1918), American educator, diplomat, and historian
 Andy White (American football), quarterback for the University of Texas Longhorns football team

See also
 Andrew White (disambiguation)